Renan da Silva (born 2 January 1989), more commonly known as Renan Silva, is a Brazilian professional footballer who plays as an attacking midfielder for Indonesian club Persik Kediri.

Honours

Clubs
A.C Olaria
Cup Washington Rodrigues: 2011
Petrolul Ploieşti 
Romanian Cup: 2013
Dibba Al Fujairah
UAE Division 1: 2015
Chainat Hornbill
Thai FA Cup: 2016
Nova Iguaçu F.C
Cup Extra Championship Carioca: 2017
Persija Jakarta
 Liga 1: 2018

Individual 
 Liga 1 Best Player: 2019
 Liga 1 Team of the Season: 2019

References

1989 births
Living people
People from Rio de Janeiro (city)
Brazilian footballers
Footballers from Rio de Janeiro (city)
Association football midfielders
Brazilian expatriate footballers
Campeonato Brasileiro Série B players
Campeonato Brasileiro Série C players
Liga I players
Saudi Professional League players
Saudi First Division League players
Renan Silva
UAE First Division League players
Persian Gulf Pro League players
Qatari Second Division players
Kuwait Premier League players
Liga 1 (Indonesia) players
Esporte Clube Vitória players
Olaria Atlético Clube players
Boavista Sport Club players
FC Rapid București players
FC Petrolul Ploiești players
Al-Nahda Club (Saudi Arabia) players
Macaé Esporte Futebol Clube players
Renan Silva
Dibba FC players
Siah Jamegan players
Renan Silva
Nova Iguaçu Futebol Clube players
Al-Shamal SC players
Al Jahra SC players
Persija Jakarta players
Borneo F.C. players
Bhayangkara F.C. players
Persik Kediri players
Expatriate footballers in Romania
Expatriate footballers in Saudi Arabia
Expatriate footballers in Thailand
Expatriate footballers in the United Arab Emirates
Expatriate footballers in Iran
Expatriate footballers in Qatar
Expatriate footballers in Kuwait
Expatriate footballers in Indonesia
Brazilian expatriate sportspeople in Romania
Brazilian expatriate sportspeople in Saudi Arabia
Brazilian expatriate sportspeople in Thailand
Brazilian expatriate sportspeople in the United Arab Emirates
Brazilian expatriate sportspeople in Iran
Brazilian expatriate sportspeople in Qatar
Brazilian expatriate sportspeople in Kuwait
Brazilian expatriate sportspeople in Indonesia